The year 1868 in architecture involved some significant events.

Events
April 4 – Eduard van der Nüll hangs himself in disappointment at the public reaction to the design of the Vienna State Opera; August Sicard von Sicardsburg, his fellow architect on the project, dies a few months later of tuberculosis before the theatre is opened.
July 15 – Foundation stone laid for St Colman's Cathedral, Cobh, Ireland, designed by E. W. Pugin and George Ashlin.
Alfred Waterhouse wins the competition for the design of Manchester Town Hall in England.
Henry Hobson Richardson is commissioned to build the Alexander Dallas Bache Monument in Washington, D.C., USA.
The dome of St. Stephen's Basilica in Budapest collapses while under construction.

Buildings and structures

Buildings opened

January 9 – Pike's Opera House, New York City, USA.
January 20 – Neues Theater, Leipzig (opera house), Germany.
August 15 – Teatro Giuseppe Verdi, Busseto, Italy.
September 1 – Vienna Künstlerhaus (art gallery), Austria, designed by August Weber.
October 1 – In London, England:
St Pancras railway station train shed, designed by W. H. Barlow (construction of the permanent station buildings and Midland Grand Hotel, designed by George Gilbert Scott, has only just begun).
Bayswater, Gloucester Road and Notting Hill Gate Underground stations.
October 10 – Runcorn Railway Bridge, England.
November 30 – St Andrew's Cathedral, Sydney, Australia, completed by Edmund Blacket.

Buildings completed

Cīrava Palace, Latvia (rebuilt and expanded by Teodor Zeiler).
The Gyeongbokgung of Korea.
Hong Kong Hotel.
Grand Hotel (New York City), USA.
Gilsey's Apollo Hall (theater), New York City, USA.
Chamberlin Iron Front Building, Lewisburg, Pennsylvania, USA.
Halle Saint-Pierre (market), Paris, France
Royal Hampshire County Hospital, Winchester, England, designed by George Butterfield, advised by Florence Nightingale.
Abbey Mills Pumping Stations, London, England, designed by engineer Joseph Bazalgette, Edmund Cooper, and architect Charles Driver.
Ilkeston Town Hall, Derbyshire, England, designed by Richard Charles Sutton.
Spanish Synagogue (Prague), designed by Vojtěch Ignátz Ullmann.
Grønland Church, Christiania, Norway, designed by Wilhelm von Hanno.
Sedgwick House, Cumbria, England, designed by Paley and Austin.
The Logs, Well Road, Hampstead, London, England designed by J.S. Nightingale.
Vinegar warehouse for Hill & Evans, 33–35 Eastcheap in the City of London, designed by Robert Lewis Roumieu.

Awards
 RIBA Royal Gold Medal – Austen Henry Layard.
 Grand Prix de Rome, architecture: .

Births
February 24 – Alfred Brumwell Thomas, English architect (died 1948)
April 14 – Peter Behrens, German modernist architect and designer (died 1940)
May 13 – Arthur Anderson, Australian architect (died 1942)
June 6 – Benedict Williamson, English architect and Catholic priest (died 1948)
June 7 – Charles Rennie Mackintosh, Scottish architect, designer, watercolourist and artist (died 1928)
June 8 – Robert Robinson Taylor, first accredited African-American architect (died 1942)

Deaths
April 4 – Eduard van der Nüll, Viennese architect (born 1812)
May 23 – James Pigott Pritchett, architect of London and York (born 1789)
June 11 – August Sicard von Sicardsburg, Austrian architect (born 1813)
August 3 – Edward Welch, Welsh architect (born 1806)

References
"The Architectural and Engineering Progress made during the Year 1868" (2 January 1869) 1 The Architect 2

Architecture
Years in architecture
19th-century architecture